Hari Vishnu Kamath (13 July 1907 – 1982) was an Indian politician and member of the Constituent Assembly of India. He was elected to the lower House of Parliament, the Lok Sabha, from Narmadapuram, Madhya Pradesh, India.

Kamath qualified for the Indian Civil Service in 1938 but he left the job to join the independence movement and joined the Forward Bloc.

References

External links
Official biographical sketch in Parliament of India website

India MPs 1952–1957
India MPs 1962–1967
India MPs 1977–1979
Janata Party politicians
Praja Socialist Party politicians
1907 births
Year of death missing